József Pehl(1932-2015) is a Hungarian sprint canoer who competed in the late 1950s. He won a silver medal in the K-4 1000 m event at the 1958 ICF Canoe Sprint World Championships in Prague.

References

Hungarian male canoeists
Living people
Year of birth missing (living people)
ICF Canoe Sprint World Championships medalists in kayak
20th-century Hungarian people